Girard College is an independent college preparatory five-day boarding school located on a 43-acre campus in Philadelphia, Pennsylvania. The school was founded and permanently endowed from the shipping and banking fortune of Stephen Girard upon his death in 1831.

Girard College enrolls academically capable students, grades one through twelve, and awards a full scholarship with a yearly value of approximately $63,000 to every child admitted. The scholarship covers most of the costs of attending Girard, including tuition, room and board, books, and school uniforms. The scholarship may be renewed yearly until the student's high school graduation. Applicants must be at least six years old (by the first day of first grade), demonstrate good social skills and the potential for scholastic achievement, and come from a single-parent, low-income (determined by HUD guidelines) family. Girard accepts students based on previous school records, admissions testing, visits, and interviews. The process is conducted without preference for race, gender, religion, or national origin.

Girard's mission is to prepare students for advanced education and life as informed, ethical, and productive citizens through a rigorous educational program that promotes intellectual, social, and emotional growth.

Stephen Girard's legacy
Born in the seaport city of Bordeaux, France, Stephen Girard (1750-1831), was the eldest of nine children. His mother died when he was 11, and three years later he left to spend the next 12 years sailing the seas and learning the international mercantile and shipping business.

Girard arrived in the City of Philadelphia, in May 1776, during the momentous summer of the American Revolutionary War and remained there for the rest of his life. During his 55 years in the "City of Brotherly Love", he became the wealthiest American of his time and the fourth wealthiest American of all time, adjusted for today's dollars.

In 1777, at age 27, Girard married Mary Lum and remained married to her until her death in 1815. They had no children that lived past infancy.

His initial success in business and the source of his first fortune was international shipping and merchant activities. He sent his cargo sailing ships, crews, and captains worldwide, trading goods. He deposited his growing wealth in the First Bank of the United States, a semi-private/public financial institution chartered by Congress, with deposits and an official relationship with the United States Department of the Treasury and its domineering first Secretary of the Treasury, the newly appointed Alexander Hamilton, under the administration of the first President George Washington. The new First Bank of the U.S. had been recently established on behalf of private financiers, businesspeople, and the new central U.S. Government in the temporary national capital of Philadelphia. When the First Bank of the U.S. lost its charter two decades later in 1811, Girard bought the bank's landmark Greek Revival-styled building, left his deposited money and accounts there, and reopened as a new financial institution named the "Bank of Stephen Girard" which made him America's first private banker. He then made his second fortune in banking. Stephen Girard used his position as banker to raise the $16 million required for the fledgling U.S. government and personally funded the War of 1812 at the request of President James Madison. By his death, his fortune was approximately $7.5 million.

One of the most interesting chapters of Girard's life was his role in fighting Philadelphia's devastating yellow fever epidemic in the summer of 1793. He was instrumental in running the city's hospital at William Hamilton's home, "Bush Hill", using his business skills to better organize the primitive hospital's health care procedures and record-keeping and becoming personally involved in the nursing of patients.

With the assistance of noted attorney William J. Duane (1780-1865), in the 1820s, he wrote a long will and testament, outlining every detail of how his fortune would be used. He delighted in keeping the document secret, knowing that everyone wondered what would happen to his fortune. Immediately after he died in 1831, the provisions of his will were made public. In addition to extensive personal and institutional bequests, he left the bulk of his fortune to the city of Philadelphia to build and operate a residential school for impoverished white orphans. This innovative social vision was considered extremely unusual both then and now: to use the Girard fortune not to endow another so-called "Ivy League" college or university but to assist children in need. In 1831, the bequest was the largest single act of philanthropy up to that time in American history.

Girard's will became famous for his restriction that students must be "poor, white, male, orphans". One by one, each of those requirements has been removed. For over a century, the school remained for needy white boys. From May 1954, with the U. S. Supreme Court decision in Brown vs. Board of Education of Topeka, Kansas, there was increasing interest in making Girard College racially integrated, as the city's public schools had long been. After an extended, bitter, 14-year civil-rights struggleincluding Martin Luther King Jr.'s August 1965 address to a crowd outside Girard's front gates ("[Philadelphia,] the cradle of liberty, that has ... a kind of Berlin Wall to keep the colored children of God out") the first four black boys entered the school in September 1968. Sixteen years later, the policy of an all-male student body was also changed, and the first girls, both black and white,  were admitted in 1984. Current enrollment of Girard College in the 21st century is about evenly divided between boys and girls and about 90% African-American.

The Girard Estate remains open in perpetuity. Its endowment and financial resources are held in trust by the courts of the Commonwealth of Pennsylvania, which provides much of the school's operating budget.

History
Girard College was founded in 1833, three years before the establishment of the second-oldest public high school in America, the Central High School of Philadelphia, which soon became the capstone and flagship of the Philadelphia City Public Schools system and followed the first such secondary school in New England's Massachusetts, of the English High School of Boston in 1821, and six years before the third oldest such institution further south in Baltimore, Maryland, then named "The High School", (later renamed the "Male High School", then the "Central High School of Baltimore" when two female public high schools were established), and later The Baltimore City College, which is its title today, both are ensconced in landmark distinctive structures and are of the modern "magnet school" type, with college prep/academic curricula, strict admission standards, with noted faculty and famous alumni with respected roles in their cities and states, similar to Girard's historic role in Philadelphia along with later Central High and Girls' High. The buildings and classrooms for Girard took some time to design and construct with their expensive "Greek Revival" stone architecture, but were ready and opened on January 1, 1848, under provisions of Girard's will supervised by the appointed trustees, including banker and financier Nicholas Biddle, (1786-1844).

His vision as a school for poor, white, orphaned boys was unique in educating an entirely unserved population. Girard saw a chance to educate boys who might never reach their potential and to prepare them for useful, productive lives. Girard's vision for the school can best be understood in the context of early 19th Century Philadelphia. The city was then at the forefront of creating innovative American institutions designed to solve a specific social challenge, such as the newly founded and constructed Eastern State Penitentiary (humane incarceration), the Pennsylvania Hospital (mental illness), the Pennsylvania Asylum for the Deaf and Dumb (disabilities), and the Franklin Institute (scientific knowledge). Girard chose to dedicate his immense fortune to helping educate young men of Philadelphia as Americans for the future.

The specific term "orphan" appears in the will, and Girard specified "poor, white, male" orphans.

However, in 1831, a mother who became a widow had no rights and resources, and "guardians" were often appointed by the "Probate" or "Orphan courts" of the city and state. Girard operated as a school for fatherless boys rather than children with no living parents or guardians. (The College in the 19th Century determined the legal definition of the term "orphan" was "a fatherless child".) As the 20th Century progressed and women achieved full and equal rights and status including the right to vote, the descriptive term "orphans" became outmoded and deemed erroneous as a term of modern reference for Girard students.

Not part of the School District of Philadelphia, which had long been racially integrated (as being in a northern, formerly "free state"), Girard College was still considered "private" even though it had a very public educational mission and was racially segregated long before the consideration of the "Brown v. Board of Education" legal case. Girard College was ordered to desegregate by the U.S. Supreme Court's 1954 unanimous decision. Perhaps the key to the ruling was that Girard, following its founder's will, was administered by the "Board of Directors of City Trusts", and that public institution could not continue to maintain the historically outdated entrance requirement.

For fourteen years, the legal battle to desegregate Girard College continued. Cecil B. Moore and the Philadelphia Freedom Fighters marched around the wall encompassing the campus for seven months in 1965. Stanley Branche and seven other members of the Black Coalition Movement were arrested when they attempted to scale the walls.  A highlight of these protests came on August 2 of that year when Dr. Martin Luther King Jr. came to the front gates of Girard's campus and addressed the protesters.

The first four African-American male students were finally admitted on September 11, 1968.

The first female student was admitted as a first grader in 1984, following more adjustments to the admission criteria so that the death of a father was no longer required. Girls were gradually integrated into the College over a 12-year enrollment period, with subsequent new female students only permitted to enroll in the same graduating class as the first female student or a younger class. The first young women graduated with a Girard diploma in 1993. Girard's first female valedictorian was Kimberly Green. The graduating Class of 1996 was the first class to graduate with more female students than males, although it remains more or less balanced yearly.

The College made history in May 2009 when it named Autumn Adkins as its 16th president, the first female chief administrator in its (then) 160-year existence. Adkins, now Autumn Adkins Graves, was not only the first woman but also the first African-American to head the College. Adkins resigned in 2012.

Following Adkins, Clarence D. Armbrister was the first African-American man to serve in this role.

Program
All students live in single-sex dormitories arranged by grade level. Residential advisers occupy apartments in the dorm buildings. Girard requires that all students participate in the five-day program for the full benefit of its academic and residential curricula. All students go home on weekends. Girard is open to students of all religious backgrounds. Once a month at the beginning of the school day, however, all students attend a non-denominational assembly in the school's Chapel, offering a continuing forum for spiritual and moral development. The Chapel has a large pipe organ, designed and built by Ernest M. Skinner in 1933. The acclaimed instrument is used for occasional concerts and has been recorded by such organists as Virgil Fox and Carlo Curley, who was director of music at Girard College in 1970 when he was 18 years old. 

Entering 2016, enrollment at Girard was projected to be 311; of these, 122 were Elementary School students (grades 1 to 5), 89 were Middle Schoolers, and 100 attended High School (grades 9 to 12). Girard employs 127 faculty members, of which 71 are academic teachers and 56 are residential advisers. Class sizes range between 12 and 20 students in the elementary school and 16-22 students in the middle school. In the high school, honors classes have 15 students, and regular classes - 20 to 25 students.

Girard's performance-based curriculum is in accordance with national standards. All grade levels and subject areas have specific benchmarks and content standards that measure successful student outcomes and achievements. Girard is accredited by the Middle States Association of Colleges and Secondary Schools. It also holds membership in the National Association of Independent Schools, the Association of Boarding Schools, and the Coalition for Residential Education.

Virtually all of Girard's graduates are accepted into accredited colleges and universities, with approximately 95% continuing to higher-education institutions, a percentage far higher than most public high schools in the School District of Philadelphia.

Founder's Hall

Founder's Hall at Girard College (1833–1847) is considered one of the finest examples of American Greek Revival architecture, for which it is designated a National Historic Landmark. School founder Girard specified in his will the dimensions and plan of the building. Nicholas Biddle (1786–1844) was chairman of the School's building committee, banker and financier, and president of the later revived and reorganized Second Bank of the United States in Philadelphia.

Girard's will demanded an architectural competition for the school's design. Endowed with his $2-million contribution, the 1832 competition was the first American architectural competition to participate nationally. The winning architect was Thomas Ustick Walter (1804–1887). After the Girard commission, Walter designed the dome of the United States Capitol in Washington, D.C. He returned to Philadelphia and became an assistant architect on the City Hall and, in 1857, a founding member of the American Institute of Architects (AIA).

Founder's Hall was the school's original classroom building. The plan for each floor, according to Stephen Girard's specifications, consists of a  front hall, four 50 ft. square rooms with 25 ft. ceilings arranged two-by-two, and a back hall the same size as the front hall. The scale of the spaces was impressively large when the building first opened.

Resulting from his association with architect Walter, Nicholas Biddle hired him in 1834 to convert the Biddle country seat, Andalusia, in Bucks County, Pennsylvania, from a large Pennsylvania farmhouse into an exemplary domestic Greek-Revival structure.

Notable alumni
Graduates (or, in some cases, former students) of Girard College include:

 Lawrence Cunningham, author and professor
 Eugene Daub 1960, sculptor
 Harry Davis, former Major League Baseball player
 Joseph Hallman 1998, composer, musician
 Al Harker, 1934 FIFA World Cup and professional soccer player
 Richard Harris, Alaska pioneer involved in the founding of Juneau, Alaska 
 George Hegamin, former National Football League player
 Russell Johnson, actor, "The Professor" on Gilligan's Island
 Franz Kline, Abstract Expressionist painter
 Tracey Lee, rapper
 Johnny Lush, former Major League Baseball player
 Harry "Moose" McCormick, former Major League Baseball player
 John "Jocko" Milligan, former Major League Baseball player
 John Nolen, city planner and landscape architect
 George A. Palmer, minister and radio broadcaster
 Donald Ratajczak, economist
William Ward, member of the US House of Representatives from Pennsylvania's 6th Congressional District
Dr. John Robert White, Ph.D., anthropologist, archaeologist, author, and speaker. 
 James Hamilton Windrim, artist/architect, designed the Bank of North America
 Ashton Youboty, NFL Cornerback for the Jacksonville Jaguars
 Wesley Morris New York Times cultural critic, two-time Pulitzer Prize for Criticism winner

Notable faculty
Bruce Carey, conductor
Ida Craddock, writer and advocate of free speech and women's rights

See also

List of National Historic Landmarks in Philadelphia
National Register of Historic Places listings in North Philadelphia

References

External links

 
 Listing, drawings, and photographs at the Historic American Buildings Survey
 The Winterthur Library  Overview of an archival finding aid on Girard College.
 Report of the Committee on Clothing, Diet, &c. to the Board of Trustees of the Girard College for Orphans (1835)
 Girard's will and Girard college theology (1888)
 Mr. Webster's speech in defence of the Christian ministry, and in favor of the religious instruction of the young : delivered in the Supreme Court of the United States, February 10, 1844 : in the case of Stephen Girard's will

Boarding schools in Pennsylvania
High schools in Philadelphia
Preparatory schools in Pennsylvania
Private high schools in Pennsylvania
1833 establishments in Pennsylvania
Educational institutions established in 1833
National Historic Landmarks in Pennsylvania
Private middle schools in Pennsylvania
Private elementary schools in Pennsylvania
Fairmount, Philadelphia
Colonial Revival architecture in Pennsylvania
Thomas U. Walter buildings
National Register of Historic Places in Philadelphia